Titanium silicon carbide, chemical formula Ti3SiC2, is a material with both metallic and ceramic properties. It is one of the MAX phases.

References

Extra reading

Titanium compounds
Carbides
Silicon compounds